Calliandra angustifolia is a small, riparian tree species of the Amazon Basin.

The plant has many common names, including bobinsana (alternately, bobinzana, bobensana, or bubinsana), balata, bubinianal, bushiglla, capabo, chipero, cigana, koprupi, kori-sacha, kuanti, neweí, quinilla blanca, semein, sháwi, yacu yutzu, and yopoyo.

The Shipibo-Conibo people of the Peruvian Amazon prepare a medicinal tincture from the bark of the tree, which they use to treat rheumatism and other ailments. It is heard to be
sometimes added to ayahuasca. An important native medicinal role for bobinsana are so called plant dietas, where someone gets in Touch with bobinsanas healing qualities, following a plain diet, basically No social contact, traditional staying in a little Hut, for weeks or months in the jungle.

References

Ayahuasca
angustifolia
Flora of the Amazon